Anatolius (Greek: Ανατόλιος, ? – 3 July 458) was a Patriarch of Constantinople (451 – 3 July 458). He is regarded as a saint, by both the Orthodox and Roman Catholic Churches.

Life
Anatolius was born at Alexandria. He was ordained a deacon by Cyril of Alexandria, and was present at the Third Ecumenical Council at Ephesus in the year 431.

He became Patriarch through the influence of Pope Dioscorus I of Alexandria with Emperor Theodosius II, after the deposition of Flavian by the Second Council of Ephesus, having previously been the apocrisiarius or representative of Dioscorus with the emperor at Constantinople. After his consecration, being under suspicion of Eutychianism, Anatolius publicly condemned the teachings not only of Eutyches, but also those of Nestorius, subscribing to the letters of Cyril against Nestorius and of Pope Leo I against Eutyches.

In conjunction with Pope Leo, according to Zonaras (Annals iii), he requested that the Emperor Marcian summon a general council against Dioscorus and the Eutychians, but the Imperial letter instructing Anatolius in the preparations for the Council of Chalcedon only mentions Pope Leo (Philippe Labbe, Conc. Max. Tom. iv.). In this council Anatolius presided in conjunction with the Roman legates (Labbe, Conc. Max. iv.; Evagr. H. E. ii. 4, 18; Niceph. H. E. xv. 18). By the famous 28th canon, passed at the conclusion of the council, Constantinople was made equal in dignity with Rome, "second in eminence and power to the Bishop of Rome." This displaced the traditional order of authority of the much older sees of Antioch and Alexandria. Hence arose the controversy between Anatolius and the Roman pontiff. However, the third canon of the earlier First Council of Constantinople of 381 stated that "The Bishop of Constantinople, however, shall have the prerogative of honour after the Bishop of Rome because Constantinople is New Rome." The Eastern position could be characterized as being political in nature, as opposed to a doctrinal view.

Leo complained to Marcian (Ep. 54) and to Pulcheria (Ep. 55) that Anatolius had outstepped his jurisdiction by consecrating Maximinus II as Patriarch of Antioch, as well as protesting to Anatolius (Ep. 53).

Following the council of Chalcedon, Anatolius received a letter signed by several Egyptian bishops, asking his assistance against Timothy, who was usurping the Patriarch of Alexandria (Labbe, Conc. Max. iv. iii. 23, p. 897), as a result Anatolius wrote to the emperor Leo against Timothy (Labbe, iii. 26, p. 905). The circular of the emperor requesting the advice of Anatolius on the turbulent state of Alexandria is given by Evagrius (H. E. ii. 9), and by Nicephorus (H. E. xv. 18). Edward Gibbon states that the crowning of Leo on his accession by Anatolius is the first instance of the kind on record (Theophanes, Chronicle p. 95). When he was in danger of death he was restored to health by Daniel the Stylite, who came to Constantinople to see him.

The followers of Dioscorus are said to have killed him in 458.

Anatolius was credited with composing a few hymns.

References

Attribution

Bibliography
 
"Lives of the Saints," Omer Englebert, New York: Barnes & Noble Books, 1994, pp 532,  (casebound)

External links
St Anatolius, Patriarch of Constantinople Orthodox icon and synaxarion
Christian Classics Ethereal Library: Dictionary of Christian Biography and Literature to the End of the Sixth Century A.D., with an Account of the Principal Sects and Heresies

4th-century births
458 deaths
5th-century Egyptian people
5th-century patriarchs of Constantinople
Byzantine hymnographers
5th-century Archbishops of Constantinople